Thung Luilai is a tambon (sub-district) of Khon San District, Chaiyaphum Province, northeastern Thailand. It is one of the eight sub-districts of Khon San District.

Geography
Thung Luilai has a total area of 725 square kilometers (470,000 rai),  from district office.

Neighbouring areas (from north clockwise): Thung Phra and Huai Yang in its district, Nong Phon Ngam in Kaset Sombun, and Nam Nao in Phetchabun Province.

Most of the area is mountainous and a small hillside plain.

Demography
Total population of 6,147 people (3,056 men, 3,091 women) in 2,098 households.

Economy
Thung Luilai residents are mainly engaged in agriculture. A small percentage of them are employed.

Administration
The sub-district is governed by the Subdistrict-Municipality Thung Luilai (เทศบาลตำบลทุ่งลุยลาย).

The area also consists of seven administrative villages (muban).

Places
Wat Thung Luilai Temple
Chulabhorn Dam, also known as Nam Phrom Dam
Phu Khiao Wildlife Sanctuary

In Pop Culture
Thung Luilai is the setting of a dance luk thung (country music) song, titled 'Kid Teung Thung Luilai' (คิดถึงทุ่งลุยลาย, "missing Thung Luilai"). It was sung by many performers, including Yui Yatyer and Tai Orathai, but the original belongs to Yenjit Porntawi since the 1980s.

References

Tambon of Chaiyaphum Province